Gerald Lehner (12 March 1968 – 2 September 2016) was an Austrian football referee.  Normally he worked as a plant technician.

Lehner was an Austrian Football Association (Österreichische Fußball-Bundesliga) referee from 1 July 1995 and a FIFA referee from 1 January 2002. Lehner retired from referring in 2008 for health reasons, before dying at the age of 48 on 2 September 2016.

Career

Other countries
On 17 June 2007, Lehner refereed the match between FC Moscow and Spartak Moscow in the Russian Premier League. On 15 March 2008, he refereed the match between Litex Lovech and Levski Sofia.

International
Lehner officiated two matches in the 2006 UEFA European Under-21 Football Championship in Portugal.

References

External links 
 

1968 births
2016 deaths
Austrian football referees